The Squash competition at the 2010 Central American and Caribbean Games was held in Mayagüez, Puerto Rico. 

The tournament was scheduled to be held from 18–25 July at the Bogotá in Colombia.

Medal summary

Men's events

Women's events

Mixed event

Events at the 2010 Central American and Caribbean Games
Central American and Caribbean Games
2010